"Dear.../Maybe" is a double A-side released by Japanese pop and R&B singer-songwriter Kana Nishino. It was released on December 2, 2009, by her record label SME Records.

Track listing

Chart performance
On the Billboard Japan Hot 100 chart with the issue date December 7, 2009, "Dear..." appeared on the chart at number 92. The following week "Dear..." peaked at number three jumping 89 spots.

Charts
All figures pertain to "Dear..." or the single as a whole, unless stated.

Sales and certifications

References

Kana Nishino songs
2009 singles
RIAJ Digital Track Chart number-one singles
Japanese-language songs
2009 songs
SME Records singles